Arg-e Qalandar (also Romanized as Arg-e Qalandar; also known as Arg-e Mīr Qalandar) is a village in Keybar Rural District, Jolgeh Zozan District, Khvaf County, Razavi Khorasan Province, Iran. At the 2006 census, its population was 475, in 95 families.

See also 

 List of cities, towns and villages in Razavi Khorasan Province

References 

Populated places in Khaf County